The 1987 Boston University Terriers football team was an American football team that represented Boston University as a member of the Yankee Conference during the 1987 NCAA Division I-AA football season. In their third and final season under head coach Steve Stetson, the Terriers compiled a 3–8 record (2–5 against conference opponents), finished in a three-way tie for fifth place in the Yankee Conference, and were outscored by a total of 226 to 175.

Schedule

References

Boston University
Boston University Terriers football seasons
Boston University Terriers football